Christer Rake (born 19 March 1987 in Stavanger) is a Norwegian former professional road racing cyclist.

Major results
2009
 4th Road race, National Road Championships
 5th Arno Wallaard Memorial
 6th Overall Ringerike GP
 10th Prague–Karlovy Vary–Prague
2010
 1st Overall Ringerike GP
1st Stage 4
 National Road Championships
2nd Road race
4th Time trial
 4th Overall Tour of China
2011
 7th Overall Tour of Norway
1st Stage 5
 7th Overall Tour of China
2012
 2nd Overall Mi-Août Bretonne

References

External links

1987 births
Living people
Norwegian male cyclists
Sportspeople from Stavanger